Cornelis Wilhelmus Maria Antonia (Kees) Aarts (born May 24, 1959) is a Dutch political scientist and Professor of Political Science at the Department of Public Administration (PA) of the University of Twente, particularly known for his work on comparative electoral behavior.

Biography 
Born in 's-Hertogenbosch, Aarts studied political science at the University of Amsterdam from 1977 to 1985, and received his PhD in 1990 at the University of Twente with a thesis entitled "Bodemverontreiniging en collectieve actie" (Soil pollution and collective action).

In 1985 Aarts started as academic career as assistant professor at the University of Twente, where in 2005 he was appointed Professor of Political Science. Aarts also participates in the Netherlands Institute for Advanced Study (NIAS), the Netherlands Institute of Government (NIG) and the Netherlands Organisation for Business Economics and Management (NOBEM), and was elected member of the Royal Netherlands Academy of Arts and Sciences in 2011.

His work focusses on the area of electoral and methodological research. He is also responsible for the National Election Studies and is currently Chairman of the Netherlands Electoral Research Foundation.

Selected publications
 Aarts, Cornelis WAM. Bodemverontreiniging en collectieve actie. PhD Thesis, University of Twente, 1990.
 Aarts, K., Huib Pellikaan, and Robert J. Van der Veen. Sociale dilemma's in het milieubeleid : een perspectief op de motieven, voorkeuren, intenties en het gedrag van burgers. Amsterdam : Het Spinhuis, 1995.
 Aarts, K., Jacques Thomassen and Henk van der Kolk (eds.). Politieke veranderingen in Nederland 1971-1998 : kiezers en de smalle marges van de politiek. With  Den Haag : Sdu Uitgevers, 2000.
 Aarts, K. and Henk van der Kolk (eds.). Nederlanders en Europa : het referendum over de Europese grondwet. With . Amsterdam : Bakker, 2005.

Articles, a selection:

References

External links 
 Homepage Kees Aarts at utwente.nl

 

1959 births
Living people
Dutch social scientists
Members of the Royal Netherlands Academy of Arts and Sciences
University of Amsterdam alumni
University of Twente alumni
Academic staff of the University of Twente
People from 's-Hertogenbosch